Man on the Moon is a 1975 musical written by John Phillips of the Mamas & The Papas, produced by Andy Warhol and directed by Paul Morrissey. The story concerns an American astronaut who leads a mission of interplanetary dignitaries to prevent the destruction of the universe by a bomb that has been placed on the moon by an evil scientist and primed to explode.

The original production ran at the Little Theatre in New York for 43 preview performances (beginning December 27, 1974), opened on January 29, 1975 and closed two days later, on February 1, after disastrous opening night reviews.

Background
Soon after completing work on his debut album John, the Wolf King of L.A., John Phillips came up with the idea for a space-themed musical project, inspired by his viewing of the July 1969 TV broadcast of the Apollo 11 moon landing. The initial title for the project was simply Space. Phillips worked on a script and wrote songs for Space over a period of two years with his third wife, Geneviève Waïte. Phillips envisioned that the lead role of the astronaut would be played by either Elvis or Ricky Nelson, both of whom he was friendly with.

Initial funding for the project came from producer Michael Butler, who had brought  the stage musical Hair to Broadway. Butler hired a young director called Michael Bennett to work on the project, but he and Phillips did not gel and Bennett resigned during dress rehearsals for the production at the Aquarius Theater in Los Angeles. Phillips then attempted to generate interest in a film version of the book with the help of real estate heir Leonard Holzer (a producer on the Stones documentary, Gimme Shelter and the former husband of Warhol superstar, Baby Jane Holzer). Holzer took the project to Ray Stark, producer of Funny Girl, who brought the script to the attention of Barbra Streisand, while Holzer tried to hook Jack Nicholson for the male lead. In 1972, Phillips also got a copy of the script to director George Lucas through his daughter Mackenzie Phillips, who was one of the stars of Lucas's film American Graffiti. Phillips would later maintain that Lucas got the idea to make Star Wars from Space.

When financing for the film seemed to be going nowhere, Phillips and Waïte focused their energy into making the musical happen again. They went to New York to raise money, performing the songs to potential backers as part of their pitch. Waite managed to persuade Andy Warhol to come on board as producer. Warhol's manager and film-making collaborator Paul Morrissey signed on as director of the production, which was then renamed Man on the Moon. Rehearsals took place at Andy Warhol's Factory. Morrissey, concerned about the script, hired Michael O'Donoghue to rewrite much of the dialogue, though these revisions were ultimately not used.

Musical numbers

Scene 1 – EARTH
 "Prologue" – Dr Bomb
 "Boys from the South" – Ernie
 "Midnight Deadline Blastoff" – Ernie
 "Mission Control" – Dr. Bomb, Ernie, Leroy, President, Miss America
 "Speed of Light" – Ernie, Leroy

Scene 2 – CANIS MINOR
 "Though I'm a Little Angel" – Angel
 "Girls" – King Can, Venus, Angel
 "Canis Minor Bolero Waltz" – Angel
 "Starburst" – Angel
 "Penthouse of Your Mind" – King Can
 "Champagne and Kisses" – Venus
 "Star Stepping Stranger/Convent" – Ernie, Angel
 "My Name Is Can" – King Can
 "American Man on the Moon" – Angel

Scene 3 – THE MOON
 "Welcome to the Moon" – Company
 "Sunny, Sunny Moon" – Venus, Dr. Bomb
 "Love is Coming Back" – Angel, Ernie
 "Truth Cannot Be Treason" – Leroy
 "Place in Space" – Ernie, Angel

Scene 4 – EARTH
 "Family of Man" – Dr. Bomb
 "Yesterday I Left the Earth" – Company
 "Stepping to the Stars" – Company

Phillips recorded demo versions of many of these songs, which were issued for the first time on a 2009 CD entitled Andy Warhol Presents Man on the Moon. Some were also recorded by Geneviève Waïte for her 1974 album Romance Is on the Rise (namely, "Girls", "American Man on the Moon" and "Love is Coming Back". Versions of "Star Stepping Stranger", "Penthouse of Your Mind" and "Yesterday I Left the Earth" appear on the 2007 CD Jack of Diamonds.

Characters and original cast

Dr. Bomb – Harlan S Foss
Ernie Hardy – Eric Lang
Leroy (Little Red Box) – Mark Lawhead
President and King Can – Denny Doherty (as Dennis Doherty)
Angel – Geneviève Waïte
Venus – Monique van Vooren

Celestial Choir
Mercury and Miss America – Brenda Bergman
Mars – John Patrick Sundine
Neptune – Jennifer Elder
Pluto – E. Lynn Nickerson
Saturn – Jeanette Chastonay

The original cast (and preview performances) featured Denny Doherty as Dr. Bomb and John Phillips as King Can. Two weeks before the production opened, Phillips was taken out of the production and replaced by Doherty.  Harlan Foss was hired to play Dr. Bomb.

Critical reception
The New York Times critic Clive Barnes reviewed the musical on its opening night. His write-up appeared the next day in the January 1975 edition of the newspaper. "For connoisseurs of the truly bad," he wrote, "Man On The Moon may be a small milestone." Barnes was particularly critical of Andy Warhol's involvement in the production ("Mr Warhol's artistic practice – if I have caught his drift aright - is to produce works of art so inept that their ineptitude becomes their value") but he also decried Philips story as "naive." Barnes' review was so scathing that the musical closed the next day.

Newsday critic Allan Wallack said "Man on the Moon is the kind of show that ought to be reviewed on the obit page."

Soundtrack
In 2009, a CD entitled Andy Warhol Presents Man on the Moon and credited to John Phillips was released by Varèse Sarabande as part of the John Phillips Presents series of CDs. It contains 22 previously-unreleased recordings of song demos from the musical recorded by Phillips, along with 6 songs taken from a recording made by Andy Warhol himself at one of the dress rehearsals for Man on the Moon. A multimedia portion of the CD also includes an early script for Space, photos taken of the production and backstage as well as photos of the star-studded opening night party at NYC theatre hangout Sardi's and footage of two songs taken from a video of an early rehearsal of the show.

References

External links
  Man on the Moon CD official release announcement
  "Long Lost Footage of Musical Play by John Phillips, Produced by Andy Warhol (1975)"

Reviews of the 2009 CD release

[ All Music Guide]
Blurt Online
Dusted magazine
Folk & Acoustic Music Exchange
Foxy Digitalis

1975 musicals
Broadway musicals
Science fiction musicals
Works about astronauts